The Bruges–Ostend Canal is a  long canal in Flanders, Belgium. The canal connects the North Sea to the Belgian interior, running between the cities of Ostend and Bruges. In Bruges, it is connected to three other canals: the Canal Ghent–Bruges, Damme Canal, and Boudewijn Canal which leads to the Port of Zeebrugge. Construction started in 1618, it was finished in 1623.

The 1899 European Rowing Championships were held on the canal in Ostende.

References

International canals
Canals in the Rhine–Meuse–Scheldt delta
Canals in Belgium
Canals in Flanders
Canals in West Flanders
Landmarks in Belgium